Cynthia Fuchs Epstein is an American sociologist and emeritus distinguished professor of sociology at the Graduate Center of the City University of New York. Fuchs Epstein served as president of the American Sociological Association in 2006.

Professional 
At Columbia University, Fuchs Epstein was able to study the changing American family after receiving a grant of $1,000 from the Institute of Life Insurance. Her study showed that women were beginning to enter the workforce at higher rates than they previously had, but there still weren't many jobs considered appropriate for women. This locked women out of prestigious professions and prevented upward mobility.

Fuchs Epstein's dissertation analyzed the various factors that affected whether or not women were excluded or included in the professional realm, focusing on female lawyers as a deviant case because they were rare. She decided to study a sample of women lawyers who found a way around the prevalent gender discrimination.

In 1966, she joined a number of other women who were in academics or other professional positions to form the National Organization for Women in New York City. She also actively participated in professional women's groups such as Sociologists for Women in Society (SWS) and the Professional Women's Caucus.

Fuchs Epstein participated in various hearings on gender discrimination as a scholar and activist, testifying at the Equal Employment Opportunities Commission (EEOC) where she spoke about Title VII of the Civil Rights Act and the barriers women faced in the professional world at the time. Fuchs Epstein was a consultant to the White House under two administrations, one of which being President Ford's, to the American Telephone and Telegraph Company, and General Motors. She also served at the National Academy of Sciences on the Committee of Women's Employment. She conducted research that focused on the segregation based on gender and race at AT&T. Furthermore, she served as an expert witness on the Citadel case where she argued women in this military school should be included.

Fuchs Epstein's first book was published in 1971 and was titled Women's Place: Option and Limits on Professional Careers. In it she focused on women's professional advancement as framed by the “opportunities offered them, the organizational limits placed on their ambitions, and the recognition and reward of their accomplishments.” Specifically, she incorporated gender into a discussion of social structures and status. Her work "made a crucial connection between traditional sociology and the emerging field of women's studies." Her second book was published in 1981 and was titled Women in Law. In this work she provided empirical evidence that illuminated how these processes affected the careers of female lawyers.

In 1981 Fuchs Epstein received the Merit Award of the American Bar Association for Women in Law as well as the SCRIBE's Book Award.

For her first study after completing her graduate education, she studied specifically Black female professionals whom she interviewed about the various factors that made it possible for them to achieve their positions despite the discrimination they faced for their gender and skin color. Out of this study came an article titled "Positive Effects of the Multiple Negative: Explaining the Success of Black Professional Women", which the American Journal of Sociology published in 1973 and explained that employers were willing to hire African-American women because they could look good for hiring them but not have to hire both a woman and an African-American person. Fuchs Epstein uncovered that the thought behind hiring these women was essentially killing two birds with one stone to as artificially as possible satisfy the demand for opportunities for women and African-Americans.

Fuchs Epstein's interest in women's professional lives led her to “explore the dynamics of stereotyping in all spheres of society,” focusing on how boundaries are socially constructed. Out of this came the book Deceptive Distinctions, which was published in 1988.

In the 1990s, the Association of the Bar of the City of New York's Committee on the Status of Women invited Fuchs Epstein to research why women's professional careers often ended mid-stream. She conducted a study of the professional mobility of women in several corporate law firms. From this research emerged the concept of the “glass ceiling,” which is essentially women never attaining the highest status in their careers. In 1993 Women in Law was reissued with a new section discussing the glass ceiling effect in the legal profession.

Fuchs Epstein was invited to meet with Hirsh Cohen, vice-president of the Alfred Sloan Foundation, in 1994. She conducted research that discovered that a very small percentage of lawyers (less than three percent) chose to work part-time because this caused others to perceive them as less committed to their professional life and ultimately resulted in them not being given very meaningful work. This research informed her next book, titled The Part-time Paradox: Time Norms, Professional Life, Family and Gender, published in 1999.

She produced a paper titled "Border Crossings: The Constraints of Time Norms in Transgressions of Gender and Professional Roles," published in 2004, that examines how doing something professionally, which goes against the expectations for women, is prevented by time norms which create priorities in certain categories for people. It looks at the ways in which ideologies of time, such as the idea that professions are greedy institutions, as well as gender ideologies, like the concept that women should take care of the family, restrict social change.

Fuchs Epstein is Emeritus Distinguished Professor of Sociology at the City University of New York Graduate Center and has been since 1990. She is a past president of the American Sociological Association. She has been a visiting professor or scholar at the Russel Sage Foundation, the Stanford Center for Advanced Study in the Behavioral Sciences, and the Stanford and Columbia Law Schools, among many other places. She was chair of the ASA Occupations and Organizations, Culture, and Sex and Gender Sections and president of the Eastern Sociological Society. She was also a Guggenheim Fellow.

Among the many professional awards she has received are the ESS Merit Award, the ASA Jessie Bernard Award, and the first Sex and Gender Section award for distinguished contribution to gender scholarship.

Selected publications 
 Deceptive Distinctions: Sex, Gender, and the Social Order.  New Haven: Yale University Press, 1990.  
 Women in Law. New York: Basic Books, 1980. 
 Women's Place: Options and Limits in Professional Careers. Berkeley: University of California Press, 1970.

References 

Living people
Presidents of the American Sociological Association
City University of New York faculty
Graduate Center, CUNY faculty
American sociologists
American women sociologists
Columbia University alumni
Year of birth missing (living people)
21st-century American women